Báiki: The International Sámi Journal is a biannual English-language publication that coveres Sami culture, history, and current affairs. The coverage also includes the community affairs of the Sami in North America, estimated at some 30,000 people. "Báiki" means “the home you carry with you” in the Sami language. It refers to the identity that is always in the heart. The magazine was so named because it was distributed among North American Sami people, and was therefore meant to remind them of their Sami heritage and identity.

History and profile
The magazine was first published in 1991 in Duluth, Minnesota. The founding editor of the journal was Faith Fjeld. One of the editors was Nathan Muus. Báiki maintains an editorial office in Oakland, California. Faith was the chief editor for 37 editions of Baiki After Faith’s death in 2014, her friends and colleagues Nathan Muus, Marlene Wisuri, and Ruthanne Cecil took over co-editing for future issues.

Báiki is a non-profit project of the Center for Environmental Economic Development, supported by grants from the Barbro Osher Pro Suecia Foundation, subscriptions, contributions and advertisements. The last subscription-based issue was released in June 2015. It was a memorial issue in honor of Faith, who had passed in October of the year before. Since then, only special editions have been published. Previous editions of Baiki are no longer in print, however some editions may be obtained from the Sami Cultural Center of North America in Duluth, Minnesota.

See also
Árran the North American Sami Newsletter.
 Sami Siida of North America a network for Sami in North America.

References

External links
 Official website
Sami Cultural Center of North America, a cultural center in Duluth, co-founded by Faith Fjeld and Marlene Wisuri.

1991 establishments in Minnesota
Biannual magazines published in the United States
Cultural magazines published in the United States
European American culture in California
Folklore magazines
Local interest magazines published in the United States
Magazines established in 1991
Magazines published in Minnesota
Mass media in Duluth, Minnesota
Sámi-American history
Sámi magazines